BK Derby is a Swedish sports club located in Linköping, Sweden. It now only active in football club but was previously involved in bandy and other sports. The club was formed on 15 April 1912. The bandy department has formed a club of its own, Derby/Linköping BK, but the two clubs have an alliance and share the same logo and colours.

Background

The club has played one season in the highest Swedish league, Allsvenskan, in 1977. The club then merged with IF Saab and formed Linköpings FF in 1981. The club was recreated as BK Derby again in 1984 and in 2003 merged with BK Wolfram. The club then played two seasons under the name BK Derby/Wolfram, but soon changed back to the original name.

BK Derby currently plays in Division 4 Östergötland Östra which is the sixth tier of Swedish football. They currently play their home matches at Folkungavallen in Linköping.

The club is affiliated to the Östergötlands Fotbollförbund.

Season to season

In their most successful period BK Derby competed in the following divisions:

In recent seasons BK Derby have competed in the following divisions:

Attendances
In recent seasons BK Derby have had the following average attendances:

Achievements
Allsvenskan:
Best placement (14th): 1977
Svenska Mästerskapet:
Runners-up: 1925

Footnotes

External links
BK Derby – official website

Football clubs in Östergötland County
Defunct bandy clubs in Sweden
Allsvenskan clubs
Association football clubs established in 1912
Bandy clubs established in 1912
Sport in Linköping
1912 establishments in Sweden